Anastasiia Evgenievna Pervushina (born 22 July 1997) is a Russian freestyle skier who competes internationally.

She competed in the FIS Freestyle Ski and Snowboarding World Championships 2021, where she placed eighteenth in women's moguls, and 21st in women's dual moguls.

References

1997 births
Living people
Russian female freestyle skiers
Olympic freestyle skiers of Russia
Freestyle skiers at the 2022 Winter Olympics
People from Chusovoy
Universiade medalists in freestyle skiing
Universiade silver medalists for Russia
Competitors at the 2017 Winter Universiade
Sportspeople from Perm Krai